Saeid Ghasemi (born 10 December 1985) is an Iranian professional futsal coach and former player.

Honours 
 Iranian Futsal Super League
 Runners-up (1): 2008–09 (Eram Kish)
 Iranian Futsal Hazfi Cup
 Champion (1): 2013–14 (Mahan Tandis)

References 

1985 births
Living people
Sportspeople from Isfahan
Iranian men's futsal players
Futsal defenders
Almas Shahr Qom FSC players
Shahrdari Saveh FSC players
Ana Sanat FC players
Iranian futsal coaches
21st-century Iranian people